Ying Liang (born 1977) is a Chinese independent film director and screenwriter.

Biography
Ying Liang graduated from the Department of Directing at the Chongqing Film Academy and Beijing Normal University. His short film The Missing House (2003) won the best script award at the Beijing Student Film Festival, and Critics Award at the Hong Kong Independent Short Film Festival.

After the success of his short films, he directed his first feature film Taking Father Home (2005), which won awards at the Tokyo Filmex Film Festival, the Hong Kong International Film Festival, and the San Francisco International Film Festival. Taking Father Home was also selected at more than 30 international film festivals including those taking place in Rotterdam, Vancouver, London, Chicago, and Fribourg.

In 2006, Ying made The Other Half, which is supported by the Hubert Bals Fund (HBF) from the International Film Festival Rotterdam. The film also won the Special Jury Prize at the Tokyo Filmex Film Festival.

Filmography

As director

Awards
 Woosuk Award at the Jeonju International Film Festival for The Other Half 2007
 Special Jury Award at the Singapore International Film Festival for The Other Half 2007
  The Special Jury Prize Kodak VISION Award at Tokyo Filmex Film Festival for The Other Half 2006
 SKYY Prize for First Feature at the San Francisco International Film Festival for Taking Father Home  2006
 Golden Digital Award at the Hong Kong International Film Festival for Taking Father Home 2006
 FIPRESCI Prize at the Singapore International Film Festival for Taking Father Home 2006
 Special Mention NETPAC Award at the Singapore International Film Festival for Taking Father Home 2006
 Special Jury Prize at the Tokyo Filmex Film Festival for Taking Father Home 2005
 Best Live Action Short Film at the Golden Horse Film Festival and Awards for A Sunny Day《九月二十八日·晴》 2016
 NETPAC Award at the Vesoul International Film Festival of Asian Cinema for A Family Tour 2019

References

External links
 
 An interview with Ying Liang, director of Good Cats with David Walsh on the World Socialist Web Site

Film directors from Shanghai
Writers from Shanghai
1977 births
Living people